Lindon Medley (born 1909) was an English professional footballer who played as a centre forward.

Career
Born in Bradford, Medley joined Bradford City from Yorkshire Amateur in August 1930. He made 7 league appearances for the club, scoring 6 goals. He left the club in 1932 to join Southport. At Southport he scored 4 goals in 5 games between October and November 1932. He later played for Blackpool Electricity & Trams and Ham's Hall.

Sources

References

1909 births
Year of death missing
Footballers from Bradford
English footballers
Association football forwards
Yorkshire Amateur A.F.C. players
Bradford City A.F.C. players
Southport F.C. players
English Football League players